Anthony D. "Tony" DiNozzo, Jr.  is a fictional character from the CBS TV series NCIS portrayed by American actor Michael Weatherly. An original cast character created by producer Donald P. Bellisario, he is credited in episode 306, but actually appearing in 305 of the series. He has also made guest appearances on the spin-offs NCIS: Los Angeles and NCIS: New Orleans.

Tony DiNozzo, born in 1972 (as guessed correctly by Caitlin Todd in the season 1 episode Split Decision) is the senior field agent of the fictional Major Case Response Team (MCRT) led by Leroy Jethro Gibbs (Mark Harmon) a former Marine Gunnery sergeant. The team investigates major crimes involving military personnel, often dealing with local law enforcement officers (LEOs).  A former police detective, he is characterized as an outgoing, joking, charismatic former jock and frequent lothario.  His charisma helps him do undercover work and to deal with intra-agency conflicts. He often leads the team's crime scene investigations, where medical examiner Dr. Mallard (David McCallum) would put him through physical exertion for evidence retrieval. Over the course of the series, he carries a few storylines, including an undercover assignment that goes through seasons four and five to catch an international arms dealer. DiNozzo provided some comic relief for an otherwise serious drama, regularly spouting movie trivia, especially in the early seasons, and as a Casanova, his dating provided many roguish experiences. The death of agent Caitlin Todd and DiNozzo's relationship with agent Ziva David become fundamental to his subtle shift in attitude and character development.

The character drew mixed reactions from the audience. According to Bellisario, Tony was often criticized by the female audience at the beginning of the shows run for his male chauvinism. This softened after Weatherly decided to tone down that aspect of his portrayal, and afterwards the character was better received. Critics continued to be both amused and annoyed by his "charming goofball" persona. By 2011, Weatherly was listed among the top-10 most-popular actors on primetime television, according to Q Score.

In January 2016, Weatherly and CBS confirmed that season thirteen would be DiNozzo's last as a series regular. In the show, DiNozzo leaves after learning that he has a daughter with his former partner Special Agent Ziva David, who apparently died in a mortar attack on her home in Israel. DiNozzo leaves NCIS to "look for some answers" and to care for their daughter.

Character creation and casting
Michael Weatherly was cast for the role of Tony DiNozzo Jr. in 2003. Series creator Don Bellisario related the events that led to Weatherly being selected:

On another occasion, Bellisario stated, "I can't say enough about Michael Weatherly...He started out on NCIS [playing] a character who was just very unlikable to some women because he was just such a chauvinist, and he has gradually over the [seasons] changed—taken his character and softened it."

Weatherly said that he had initially been reluctant to join a JAG spin-off and explained, "But I went and had this dinner with Don Bellisario in Australia and his personality, his storytelling and his presence and everything kind of won me over." He later commented, "I got very lucky with Don Bellisario. He directed two of the first three episodes, and he really pushed me to try things and experiment and some of the wacky comedy came out of that. And it was kind of unexpected and I didn't really know what I was going to find."

At another point, Weatherly said, "It's kind of fun to play a total dinosaur in terms of sexual politics...The shallow end of the philosophical pool is obviously where Tony paddles around." In the same interview, actress Cote de Pablo (who portrays character Ziva David) added, "There's something deeper about that character. We always talk about the superficial element and the things that make us laugh. But he wouldn't be doing what he does if he wasn't really good at it. It's a complex character, and that's why people love it."

Weatherly directed the 2011 episode "One Last Score" and the 2013 episode "Seek".

Fictional character background

Tony was born in a wealthy Italian-American family from Long Island, New York. His great-grandparents immigrated from Italy through Ellis Island. His great-grandfather worked as a truck-driver before eventually starting his own transportation company. Though an only child, he has been cut off from his maternal family's fortune. According to Tony, his mother died in the hospital while they were watching a movie when he was eight years old. One of Tony's fondest childhood memories during the holidays is watching the movie It's a Wonderful Life, and he later tells Ziva that his mother had taken him to the movies frequently before her death, resulting in his love of film.

Tony's father, Anthony DiNozzo Sr., played by Robert Wagner, is an American Civil War reenactor and as a child, Tony would carry the "poop bucket" during reenactments, resulting in Tony's dislike of anything relating to the Civil War. DiNozzo Sr. skirts very close to the line between a businessman and a con man, and at one point Tony was left in a hotel room for two days when his father left for a supposed business meeting. In the episode "Flesh and Blood", the two display similar personality traits—they both flirt with women and quote movies. It is stated in this episode that his father is pretending to be rich when he is actually bankrupt. It is also revealed that after his mother's death, Tony spent much of his childhood in a number of boarding schools and summer camps, so he and his father spent very little time together and rarely kept in touch. Consequently, father and son had a frosty relationship. It has also been suggested that his father was emotionally neglectful.

Aside from the odd comment or casual reference, Tony rarely mentioned his parents until season 7, when Anthony DiNozzo Senior makes his first appearance. In "Sins of the Father", he admits to Gibbs that, although his dad still "makes [him] crazy", he still loves him but has been unable to tell his dad so. In "Broken Arrow", DiNozzo Sr. helps Gibbs with a case by using his contacts and going undercover with Ziva at a party in the home of a well-known arms dealer. Tony and his father also reconcile their differences.

Other family members mentioned in NCIS episodes include a button-collecting grandfather who bequeathed Tony one thousand shares in a dot-com, and a number of uncles. His uncle Vincenzo is a butcher on Long Island. A second uncle was a successful businessman, but was found at a golf course looking for mole people. A third uncle named Clive Paddington, wealthy and deceased, left his entire estate to his paternal nephew Crispian Paddington.

Fictional education and work history

After being expelled from six boarding schools in four years, Tony graduated from the Remington Military Academy in Tiverton, Rhode Island. He later completed a Bachelor of Arts in physical education at Ohio State University, where he was on the varsity basketball team and competed in the Final Four. DiNozzo discusses a football game in the episode "SWAK", in which his doctor broke his leg. In the same discussion, Tony claims he and the doctor "kissed each others’ sisters," a football term meaning the game ended in a tie. In the episodes "Bikini Wax" and "Trojan Horse", he mentions he is in the Ohio State Alpha Chi Delta fraternity, class of 1989. At the end of the episode "Red Cell", he begins to tell a story about his fraternity days before Gibbs interrupts him. In the episode "Child's Play", he mentions receiving a combined score of 950 on his SATs.

He has worked in three different police departments—Peoria, Philadelphia, and Baltimore—staying in each location for an average of two years. At the end of his stint with Baltimore's homicide division, he was hired by NCIS in 2001 as stated in season 1, episode 4. This event occurred prior to the NCIS pilot, and the circumstances of his hiring are unexplained, but Tony once jokingly claimed that it was because he "smiled". It is later revealed in the season eight episode "Baltimore" that Tony left Baltimore PD after discovering that his partner, Danny Price, was a dirty cop.

During his tenure as a NCIS special agent, Tony has operated as a supervisory special agent and undertaken a long-term undercover operation throughout season four. In season two, he nearly dies from a bout with the pneumonic plague after a woman sends a letter filled with genetically altered Yersinia pestis to NCIS for revenge for what she believed to be neglect of a cold case. Tony ably leads the team in Gibbs's absence when the latter retires to Mexico after recovering from a coma. When Gibbs returns to lead the team, Tony declines an offer to lead his own team and resumes his former position to support Gibbs, who is suffering from the aftereffects of the coma, and continue working with the team he considers family. At the end of season five, Tony is assigned as Special Agent Afloat to the USS Ronald Reagan and later to the USS Seahawk. However, at the beginning of season six, he is reassigned to his original team at NCIS headquarters in Washington, D.C. During season eight he meets E.J. Barrett, who took the post as team leader in Spain that he had previously rejected.
In the season 8 finale, Clayton Jarvis, the new Secretary of the Navy, tells Director Vance that he wants to include DiNozzo in NCIS's black operations program after the death of Lt. Jonas Cobb and the resignation of Jarvis's predecessor, Philip Davenport. Although Vance seems reluctant, Jarvis overrules him and gives DiNozzo his first assignment: stop an NCIS agent who is leaking information. As season nine opens with the episode "Nature of the Beast", it is revealed that NCIS Special Agent Simon Cade is the apparent mole. At the end of the episode, DiNozzo is shot by an impostor FBI agent who had killed Cade and attempted to frame DiNozzo for the murder.

DiNozzo frequently refers to himself as "Very Special Agent Anthony DiNozzo". He also refers to Ziva David as "Very Special Probationary Agent" at least once. Tony also referred to Timothy McGee as "Very Special Agent Timothy McGee" after resigning from his position as Senior Field Agent, along with referring himself and McGee as "Very Special Agents" in the Leap of Faith episode.

Characterization

Tony is written as a streetwise promiscuous former homicide detective. His behavior toward women is occasionally noted by other characters to be chauvinistic, and throughout the series Tony is shown flirting with most women he encounters. He does not respect personal boundaries, going so far as to rifle through his colleagues' possessions, both at work and in their homes, and to listen to private phone calls. In the episode "SWAK", Caitlin Todd described him as an "X-rated Peter Pan" who is "annoying" but whose absence is nevertheless keenly felt. The targets of this behavior are either victims of Tony's quests for new sources of amusement, or those for whom he believes he has reason to be concerned. Michael Weatherly commented on Tony's characterization: "Part of the dynamic of the show is that Tony irritates people, but when he's not around, they kind of miss him."

Although Tony is canonically in his thirties, he is typically written as possessing a juvenile sense of humor that manifests itself in name-calling, teasing, and pranks directed at his colleagues. Tony delights in quoting movies in everyday life, often mimicking the original actor when quoting them; Sean Connery's James Bond and Tommy Lee Jones come up frequently. Tony also finds parallels between the cinema and his everyday life. This occasionally proves to be more useful than aggravating, as when his application of a solution from the movie Speed (1994) ends in the successful resolution of a case. In a nod to NCIS creator Donald P. Bellisario, Tony has also been established as a fan of Bellisario television series Magnum, P.I. and Airwolf. In the episode "Dead Man Talking", Tony introduces himself to a suspect as Airwolf character "Stringfellow". Tony's coworkers often display visible frustration with his behavior, but throughout the series Tony has been shown to be very loyal to his coworkers at NCIS, particularly his supervisor, Leroy Jethro Gibbs.

Although his immature behavior often gets Tony into trouble, he also demonstrates that he is an insightful agent when the need arises. On more than one occasion he surprises his colleagues when an outwardly immature action on his part causes new evidence to be uncovered. Gibbs once said of him, "You may not admire his methods but you gotta love the results", referring to when Tony goes to a gynecologist to track a missing sailor's girlfriend down after the rest of the team hit a dead end, much to Kate's disgust. McGee has described Tony's interrogation style as "Dirty Harry meets Keystone Cop". He is generally written as a highly capable agent, and in season four is offered a prized position as a supervisory/senior special agent in charge in Rota, Spain, which he nonetheless turns down. As of season ten, he is the only one out of Gibbs's field team who has been allowed to head an investigation, as seen in "Bounce" when Gibbs swaps places with him as the victim was connected with one of Tony's old cases and even calls him "boss". Tony is known to be fluent in Spanish, as is established from his earliest appearance in the JAG-NCIS crossover episodes. As Gibbs's senior field agent, he often pulls rank by ordering the more junior agents around and playing pranks on them. He most notably calls McGee "Probie", at least until Ziva is made a full-fledged agent. With the addition Ellie Bishop, Tony and McGee begin calling her "Probie" and similarly order her around, claiming that "it's part of the job".

Tony claims to have 20/10 vision in the episode "Left for Dead"; however, in the episodes "The Curse", "Ice Queen", and "Meltdown" he can be seen wearing glasses and in the "Nature of the Beast" episode he claims his vision is 20/20. He owned a 1990 Corvette ZR1, which was stolen and subsequently destroyed during a high-speed chase as he watched on live television. Later, he drove a 1966 Ford Mustang. The car was destroyed by a bomb planted on it in an attempt to kill DiNozzo's significant other, Dr. Jeanne Benoit.

The character is initially portrayed as a "technophobe" who, like his superior, has limited patience with the scientific method and technical terms. However, he can be seen to develop an aptitude for technology in later episodes, and has been depicted hacking into computer systems.

Tony is also very skilled in going undercover, which is shown in several episodes. In "Split Decision" he poses as a rogue weapons-dealer, and in "Chained" he befriends an escaped convict while disguised as a prisoner. In "Dead Man Talking", he is able to improvise a cover identity to get close to a suspect when he feels the investigation is going nowhere.

Relationships

Women
During the run of NCIS, Tony consistently speaks at great length about women. He pursues women on a regular basis, typically indiscriminately. Most of these relationships fail to progress past a certain point and have occasionally ended with humorously disastrous results. He has admitted to having commitment issues.

One of the women he was attracted to turned out to be a terrorist working with Ari Haswari; another to whom he was attracted, and kissed, turned out to be a pre-operative transsexual who had murdered one of Tony's co-workers. His co-worker Caitlin Todd gave him endless grief for that lapse of judgement in the episode "Dead Man Talking". He once dated a social worker named Michelle, who, after he ended their relationship, broke into his apartment and filled his closet with dog feces. He had a short relationship with NCIS Special Agent Paula Cassidy. He also broke up with a Navy lieutenant who had left her then-fiancé for him, and shortly after Tony broke up with her, she posted his personal information on a herpes-alert website.

The show's writers make reference to one of Weatherly's real-life relationships in the episode "Hiatus (Part 1)" when he states, "I've got a better chance of hooking up with Jessica Alba...". Weatherly's real-life relationship with Alba occurred while both were performing on the television series Dark Angel. In a flashback in the episode "Baltimore" Tony mentions proposing to his high-school music teacher and long-term girlfriend Wendy. Wendy is introduced in the season nine episode "Secrets".

Abby Sciuto

Tony has a friendly platonic relationship with Abby Sciuto. Abby describes this as progressive: "You're like a piercing, Tony. Takes a while for the throbbing to stop and the skin to grow back". The strength of their friendship was demonstrated when she helped clear his name after her assistant framed him for murder, or when he is seemingly killed in an explosion, or when he returns from his time as an agent afloat. Abby once states, "I love you, and would hate to see you hurt". She sometimes becomes upset with him, but these feelings are often resolved quickly. Abby shares Tony's love of movies which solidifies their friendship. When Gibbs is injured in the season three finale and retired during the first few episodes of season four, Tony is usually the one to bring her Caf-Pow (a highly caffeined energy drink). He is also protective of her, especially after Ari Haswari made an attempt on her life in "Kill Ari". While Abby was in a coma, Tony was very worried about her, to the point he did not make a joke about McGee's last name.

Dr. Jeanne Benoit

In season four, Tony's new girlfriend, Dr. Jeanne Benoit, is introduced and appears as a recurring figure and subplot throughout the season. Tony initially wants to "take it slow" out of fear of their relationship becoming like his earlier ones. They subsequently consummate their relationship in the episode "Smoked" and Tony takes inspiration from movies to make their relationship special. Despite good intentions, Tony is unable to tell Jeanne that he loves her, until the death of a fellow agent convinces him to do so.

In the episode "Angel of Death", it is revealed that Jeanne's father is a wanted arms dealer. In the episode "Bury Your Dead", it is revealed that Tony is using Jeanne to infiltrate an arms smuggling network. Jeanne leaves Tony a greeting card in her apartment, as she leaves the Washington, D.C. area.
In the episode "Family", Tony is shown struggling with how his relationship with Jeanne ended, with flashbacks of their relationship. Ziva tries to console Tony, but he rejects her attempts, insisting that he is fine. Contemplating whether he should leave NCIS to be with Jeanne, he rejoins the team.

Jeanne reappears in the episode "Internal Affairs", when she accuses Tony of murdering her father. At the end of the episode, Tony apologizes for letting her get involved in something that was not her fault. Asked if their relationship was real, Tony answers "No". Jeanne then tells him she wishes she had never met him.
In a conversation with Tara Kole, Tony admits that, since his relationship with Jeanne ended, he has not been enjoying his normal level of success with women, despite his continued bravado to his co-workers.

In the episode "Saviors", Jeanne and Tony are shown to be on amicable terms. Later, in "Loose Cannons" Tony encounters Jeanne and her husband while investigating a case, where she worries about it being connected with her father. This proves to be correct, and they both struggle emotionally with the conflict that ended their relationship.

Wendy Miller
Tony's ex-fiancée is mentioned briefly in the episode "Baltimore" as Wendy Miller, portrayed by Perrey Reeves. In "Secrets", it is revealed that she left him the night before their wedding.

Zoe Keats
Tony's former Philadelphia PD partner, portrayed by Marisol Nichols. Keats appears in the season twelve episode "Parental Guidance Suggested", later in episodes "The Enemy Within & No Good Deed". Keats is an ATF Special Agent and becomes Tony's girlfriend.

Female Agents

Special Agent Caitlin Todd

Tony's relationship with Kate could be depicted as either like sibling rivals, but also could be romantic too. Series creator Don Bellisario said that if Kate hadn't died, she and Tony would have embarked on a relationship at one point during the series. They constantly compete, and Kate is often critical of Tony's attitude towards women and his disrespect for personal boundaries. In one episode, Tony sneaks into the bathroom while Kate was having a shower, to brush his teeth, which infuriates her. In "Bikini Wax", he threatens to expose a picture of Kate during a wet t-shirt contest. In the episode "Pop Life" they seek counseling for their bickering.

Tony buys flowers as a peace offering after annoying her in the episode "Vanished" and shows concern for her in "Left For Dead" and "Bête Noire", when she is held hostage by Ari. In the episode "The Bone Yard", Tony pretends to be Kate's lover. He appears close to jealousy when Kate accepts a date with the victim's brother in "Black Water". In "My Other Left Foot", Tony is obsessed by the idea of Kate having a tattoo and tries to ascertain its location. In extras seen on the season two DVD box set, the producers state that it was intended for there to be a relationship between these two characters. In the episode "SWAK", after Kate is found uninfected, she continues to stay with Tony, lying about her condition to him even though she knows that the risk of infection is still imminent. She is devastated as he seemed about to die, and relieved as he survives.

Kate's death would have a serious impact on Tony, which along with other events make Tony "grow up" during the following seasons. As shown in the episodes "Kill Ari 1 & 2", the team struggles to deal with the shooting, culminating in a scene in which Tony and McGee mourn over the dead body of their deceased colleague in Ducky's autopsy room.

After Kate's death, like the other characters, DiNozzo also has a vision of her postmortem. Typical to Tony's chauvinistic personality, Kate appears in the Catholic schoolgirl uniform that he had been asking about in the episode "Bikini Wax". After telling him that she always knew what he was thinking, she realizes that she is wearing the uniform and quickly berates him. This "sexual fantasy" is portrayed after Tony offers to go back out in the pouring rain to find the bullet that killed Kate.

In the season ten episode, "You Better Watch Out", Tony is shown to have a goldfish named Kate, whom he teases like his former partner (telling the fish she's "getting fat"), despite clearly doting on it.

Special Agent Ziva David

Throughout seasons four to ten, Ziva and Tony exhibit a high level of chemistry. Although their relationship was not explicit until the beginning of season 11 (when David's actress left the show), the close bond between the two ultimately resulted in their daughter, Tali.

Special Agent E.J. Barrett

E.J. is introduced in the season eight episode "One Last Score". She took the lead investigator position in Rota, Spain, which Tony declined. Tony and E.J. begin a sexual relationship shortly after her arrival, much to the disapproval of Gibbs.

In a flashback in the season nine premiere Nature of the Beast, Tony confronted E.J. about her removal of a microchip from the body of a victim of the Port-to-Port killer. Subsequently, Tony suffers memory loss and E.J. disappears while another agent is killed. E.J. emerges from hiding in the episode "Housekeeping" and discusses events with Tony at a safe house while he is furious with her for her abrupt disappearance, but they go their separate ways after the killer is apprehended, with E.J. urging Tony to try to pursue a relationship with Ziva.

NCIS Director Jenny Shepard

In the fourth season, Tony's relationship with Jenny Shepard is shown to have warmed considerably in comparison to the end of the third season, with Tony occasionally being caught referring to her by her first name with even Gibbs joking about how close they were. This was due to Tony's involvement in an ongoing operation of personal importance to Shepard, in which they develop a strong level of trust. Their interactions become more frequent when Tony assumes Gibbs's responsibilities, and they become increasingly familiar as seen in the episode "Shalom". Tony was particularly upset at Shepard's death in "Judgment Day (Part 1)", and blames himself for following Shepard's instruction to abandon her protection detail. In the episode "Agent Afloat", Ziva reveals that, in the aftermath of Shepard's death, Tony has been drinking out of guilt.

Male Agents

Special Agent Leroy Jethro Gibbs

Through flashbacks in the episode "Baltimore", it is shown that Tony first met Gibbs in 2001 when, as a Baltimore PD officer, Tony arrested an undercover Gibbs while they were investigating the same suspect in different cases. When Tony realized that his partner was corrupt, Gibbs took the opportunity to recruit Tony to NCIS and became a mentor to him.

Tony greatly respects Gibbs and claims to have a mentor/protégé or father/son relationship with him, a feeling supported by the "tough love" Gibbs often demonstrates. Tony is easily riled when it seems that Gibbs has a new favorite and tries desperately to win back favor. Gibbs has the tendency to smack Tony on the back of the head whenever he says or does something inappropriate, starting with the last flashback sequence of "Baltimore". Tony tolerates being smacked only by Gibbs, reacting angrily when this is done by Todd and Ziva. When Gibbs starts "being nice" in the episode "Kill Ari (Part 1)", Tony irritates Gibbs until he elicits a slap to the back of the head.

Tony prides himself on knowing many of the confusing military terms, acronyms, and slang that Gibbs regularly spouts and mimics them. Tony explains this jargon to others (serving as exposition), as well as Gibbs's unorthodox interrogation techniques, often accurately predicting Gibbs's next moves. After Gibbs personally appoints Tony as his replacement at the end of season three, Tony tries to emulate Gibbs's leadership style, though he adds "campfire discussions" (an impromptu sharing of current information among his fellow agents). Throughout the first several seasons, Tony's coworkers remark that he is becoming more and more like Gibbs, much to Tony's annoyance.

Emotionally scarred when his relationship with Jeanne Benoit ends, Tony begins confiding in Gibbs on personal issues, especially after DiNozzo Sr. is introduced in season seven and the frosty love-hate relationship between father and son is revealed. Gibbs confronts DiNozzo Sr. about his lifelong neglect of his son and calls Tony the best young agent with whom he has ever worked. Although he thinks very little of DiNozzo Sr., Gibbs does encourage the two to repair their relationship. As of season ten, Gibbs and DiNozzo Sr. appear to be on friendly terms.

Special Agent Timothy McGee

Tony's relationship with Timothy McGee was initially problematic. Tony largely ignored or degraded McGee's work and later began actively hazing McGee, as the least-experienced member of the team, from name-calling to making McGee carry all the gear and equipment to a crime scene. He would largely take advantage of McGee's naiveté and unfamiliarity with the team's "customs".

Contrary to appearances, Tony values his relationship with McGee, as seen in the episode "Probie"; Tony goes out of his way to support McGee and makes an effort to cheer him up. Tony is the first to try to allay McGee's guilt when McGee accidentally shoots an undercover police officer. While Tony is field leader, McGee becomes the senior field agent and Tony shows him much more respect and confidence in his abilities.
In the seventh season, the relationship between the two agents is on a much more equal footing and Tony more frequently calls McGee by his first name, Tim.

By the eleventh season, Tony is a lot closer to McGee and they confide in one another. McGee is the one Tony tells that he has been attending a support group to get over the events of Ziva's departure. McGee also goes to Tony for advice when he is considering asking his girlfriend to move in with him.

Reception
DiNozzo was included in TV Guides list of "TV's Sexiest Crime Fighters". In November 2011, DiNozzo won TVLine's "Ultimate Male Law-Enforcement Crushes Bracket Tournament", and Ziva David won the "Ultimate Female Law-Enforcement Crushes Bracket Tournament" a month later.

His flirtation with Ziva received significant media coverage over the years, with the characters being referred to as a "power couple" by Entertainment Weekly. In 2009, TV Guide dubbed their interactions "TV's hottest love-hate relationship" and in 2012, they were listed in Entertainment Weekly "30 Best 'Will They/Won't They?' TV Couples". EW.com also included them in its list of 10 "TV pairs who have us hooked as they dance around their attraction".

During the first season of NCIS in 2004, Ross Warneke of The Age described the character as "fearless but a bit wet behind the ears". A year later, Bill Keveny from USA Today commented that DiNozzo was "competent but immature". At the beginning of the third season, Noel Holston from Sun Sentinel described him as "a self-styled ladies' man, handsome yet hapless".

In 2011, one critic from Slate called him a "womanizing doofus given to spouting movie trivia" but added that all the characters on the MCRT team (Tony, Gibbs, Ziva, and McGee) "are men and women of honor, heroes who have all made significant sacrifices for their country". In 2012, Sandra Gonzalez from Entertainment Weekly wrote, "I have a deep appreciation for everything about Tony DiNozzo. I love his goofball ways, his pop culture references, and his endless supply of ways to get under McGee's skin. But like any perpetually lovable character on a TV drama, he also has a host of dark secrets, and when said secrets have a chance to come to the surface as part of a meaty and revealing storyline, it's a treat for us all." He was referred to as a "charming goofball/special agent" by AOL TV's Michael Maloney in 2010.

Catherine Lawson from The Huffington Post reported in August 2011 that Michael Weatherly was voted as number seven in the list of the top 10 most popular primetime TV stars. Pauley Perrette (Abby Sciuto) and Cote de Pablo (Ziva David) placed first and second, respectively. Additionally, Mark Harmon (Jethro Gibbs) and David McCallum (Ducky Mallard) were voted as numbers five and six.

References

Fictional Baltimore Police Department detectives
Fictional Philadelphia Police Department detectives
Television characters introduced in 2003
Fictional Naval Criminal Investigative Service personnel
NCIS (TV series) characters
Fictional Italian American people
Crossover characters in television
Male characters in television